Dror is Hebrew for "freedom" or "sparrow" and may either be a surname or given name.

Given name 

 Dror Adani, Israeli convict
 Dror Bar-Natan (1966–), Israeli mathematician
 Dror Benshetrit, Israeli artist, designer, and inventor
 Dror Biran (1977–), Israeli pianist
 Dror Cohen (1974–), Israeli basketball coach and former player
 Dror Elimelech (1956–), Israeli psychiatrist, psychotherapist, poet, and composer
 Dror Feiler (1951–), Israeli-born Swedish musician, artist, and activist
 Dror Fixler, Israeli physicist
 Dror Green, Israeli psychotherapist and author
 Dror Hajaj (1978–), Israeli basketball player
 Dror Kashtan (1944–), Israeli footballer and manager
 Dror Mishani, (1975–), Israeli crime writer, translator, and literary scholar
 Dror Moreh, Israeli cinematographer and director
 Dror Paley (1956–), Israeli-born Canadian orthopedic surgeon
 Dror Shaul (1971–), Israeli filmmaker, commercial director, and film writer-director
 Dror Soref, Israeli-American filmmaker and social reformer
 Dror Sttzki, Israeli footballer
 Dror Toledano (1957–), Israeli artist and photographer
 Dror Zahavi (1959–), Israeli film director and screenwriter
 Dror Zeigerman (1948–), Israeli politician and diplomat

Surname 
Note: Some Israelis hebraicized the Ashkenazi surname Friedman to Dror 
 David M. Dror, health insurance specialist
 Duki Dror (1963–), Israeli filmmaker
 Inbal Dror (1979–), Israeli fashion designer
 Rachel Dror (1921–), Israeli-German teacher and holocaust survivor
 Shmuel Ben-Dror (1924–2009), Israeli footballer
 Yehezkel Dror (1928–), Austrian-born Israeli political science professor

Given names derived from birds
Hebrew-language given names
Hebrew-language surnames